Grandview Heights is a suburb in western Hamilton in New Zealand.

Grandview had a population of 3,132 at the 2013 New Zealand census, an increase of 147 people since the 2006 census. There were 1,467 males and 1,662 females. Figures have been rounded and may not add up to totals. 65.1% were European/Pākehā, 32.4% were Māori, 6.6% were Pacific peoples and 9.0% were Asian.

In the 2018 census the name disappeared and most of the area became part of Nawton East.

See also 
 List of streets in Hamilton
Suburbs of Hamilton, New Zealand

References

Suburbs of Hamilton, New Zealand